Santal Pargana Mahila College, established in 1974, is a girl's general degree college in Dumka, Jharkhand. It offers undergraduate and postgraduate courses in science, arts and commerce. It is affiliated to  Sido Kanhu Murmu University.

Accreditation
Santal Pargana Mahila College was accredited by the National Assessment and Accreditation Council (NAAC).

See also
Education in India
Literacy in India
List of institutions of higher education in Jharkhand

References

External links
http://spmahilacollege.com/

Colleges affiliated to Sido Kanhu Murmu University
Universities and colleges in Jharkhand
Educational institutions established in 1974